Buchanania sessilifolia is a tree in the family Anacardiaceae. The specific epithet  is from the Latin meaning "leaf without stalk", referring to the sessile leaves.

Description
Its smooth bark is grey-brown. The flowers are whitish.

Distribution and habitat
Buchanania sessilifolia grows naturally in Laos, Thailand, Sumatra, Peninsular Malaysia and Borneo. Its habitat is lowland forests from sea-level to  altitude.

References

sessilifolia
Trees of Laos
Trees of Thailand
Trees of Sumatra
Trees of Peninsular Malaysia
Trees of Borneo
Plants described in 1850